Anjirabad Rural District is a rural district (dehestan) in the Central District of Gorgan County, Golestan Province, Iran. At the 2006 census, its population was 22,305, in 5,561 families.  The rural district has 16 villages.

References 

Rural Districts of Golestan Province
Gorgan County